CD-200 or No. 200 was a Type D escort ship of the Imperial Japanese Navy during World War II.

History
She was laid down on 31 January 1945 at the Nagasaki shipyard of Mitsubishi Heavy Industries for the benefit of the Imperial Japanese Navy and launched on 19 March 1945. On 20 April 1945, she was completed and commissioned. On 17 May 1945, she struck a mine outside Miyazu harbor.  On 15 August 1945, Japan announced their unconditional surrender and she was turned over to the Allies in September 1945. On 30 November 1945, she was struck from the Navy List and scrapped on 1 July 1948.

References

1945 ships
Type D escort ships
Ships built by Mitsubishi Heavy Industries